"When Sunny Gets Blue" is a song written by Marvin Fisher (music) and Jack Segal (lyrics), which has become a jazz standard. The song was originally recorded in September 1956 by Johnny Mathis backed by Ray Conniff and his Orchestra, released in February 1957 as the B-side of Mathis's debut single "Wonderful! Wonderful!". The song was included on the compilation album Johnny's Greatest Hits, released in April 1958. The album was a smash hit, staying on the Billboard pop chart for 490 weeks, including 3 weeks at number 1, and 57 weeks in the Top Ten.

The song was recorded in January 1957 by June Christy for her album Fair and Warmer!, released later that year. Pete Rugolo arranged and conducted for Christy. Around the same time, Nat King Cole recorded it for his album Love Is the Thing, with this rendition praised by music critic Will Friedwald as displaying Cole's "tenderness, compassion and empathy". Arranger Gordon Jenkins backed Cole.

Legal case
"When Sunny Gets Blue" begins with the lyrics "When Sunny gets blue, her eyes get grey and cloudy; then the rain begins to fall." In 1984, DJ Rick Dees, a radio personality at Los Angeles radio station KIIS-FM, recorded a parody of the song for an album, including the lyrics "When Sunny sniffs glue, her eyes get red and bulgy, then her hair begins to fall". Dees sought permission to use the lyrics, but was refused; subsequently, he used 8 bars of the song under the fair use doctrine.  In 1986, composer Marvin Fisher and lyricist Jack Segal sued Dees for copyright violation and defamation in U.S. District Court for Los Angeles.  At the request of the parties involved, the district court issued a summary judgment, finding for Dees.  Fisher appealed the case to the U.S Court of Appeals for the 9th District, in Pasadena, California.  The appellate court affirmed the judgment of the lower court in Fisher v. Dees 794 F.2d 432 (9th Cir. 1986), stating that the parody was intended to "criticize" for the purposes of humor, not to "copy", and did not damage the marketability of the original because they were two different markets of music.  The case has become a landmark one, further refining the doctrine of fair use in U.S. copyright law.

References

1956 songs
1950s jazz standards
Johnny Mathis songs
Songs written by Jack Segal